Karl Otto Paul Weinrich (2 December 1887 – 22 July 1973) was a Nazi Party official and politician who was Gauleiter of Gau Kurhessen.

Early life
Weinrich was born in Molmeck (today, Hettstedt) the son of a shoe manufacturer. After attending volksschule and a mining vocational school there, he worked briefly as a mining trainee of copper, silver and iron ore. He then volunteered for the Prussian army in 1906, assigned to the 28th Infantry Regiment, "von Goeben," working as an administrative clerk and attaining the rank of Sergeant by 1912.

During the First World War he was employed in an army provisions office in Germany. After the war, Weinrich worked in a government supply office from 1920, first in Cologne and from 1920 in Landau in the Rhenish Palatinate. Becoming politically active, he joined the Deutschvölkischer Schutz- und Trutzbund, the largest and most influential  anti-Semitic, völkisch organization in Germany. 

In February 1922 Weinrich joined the Nazi Party and founded local groups (Ortsgruppen) in Landau and other towns in the Palatinate. At this time he was active in opposition to the French occupation of the Rhineland. In May 1923, Weinrich was sentenced by a French military court to four months imprisonment due to his nationalist activities and anti-French agitation. However, Weinrich fled across the Rhine, settled in Kassel and found employment as a laborer. In 1924 he joined the Reich Compensation Office as a tax secretary.

Nazi Party career
Meanwhile, the Party had been banned in the wake of the failed Beer Hall Putsch in November 1923. After the ban was lifted, Weinrich immediately rejoined it in February 1925 (membership number 24,291). He co-founded the Ortsgruppe in Kassel, becoming the Ortsgruppenleiter (Local Group Leader). He also served from 1925 to 1927 as Treasurer and Deputy Gauleiter of Gau Hesse-Nassau North. On 1 September 1927 he became Acting Gauleiter, when Walter Schultz was placed on leave of absence, and was named permanent Gauleiter on 1 February 1928. The Gau was renamed Gau Kurhessen on 1 January 1934.

Weinrich failed in his bid to be elected to the Prussian Landtag on 20 May 1928. However, on 17 November 1929 he became a City Councilor in Kassel, a member of the Kassel Municipal Parliament and the Hesse-Nassau Provincial Parliament. On 14 October, 1930 he was elected to the Prussian Landtag, serving until October 1933, and was a member of its executive committee from May 1932. From 1933 was a member of the Prussian Provincial Council for the Province of Hesse-Nassau and from 1933 to 1934 he was the Deputy Authorized Representative of the Province to the Reichsrat. From 11 July 1933 to 1945 he was a member of the Prussian State Council, and from 12 November 1933 to 1945, he was a member of the Reichstag for electoral constituency 19, Hesse-Nassau.

A member of the paramilitary  National Socialist Motor Corps (Nationalsozialistisches Kraftfahrkorps, NSKK), he reached the rank of NSKK-Obergruppenführer on 30 January 1939. He was a holder of the Golden Party Badge.

The war years
After the outbreak of World War II, Weinrich was made a member of the Defense Committee for Wehrkreis (Military District) IX which included Gau Kurhessen. On 15 November 1940, he was made the Housing Commissioner for his Gau, and on 6 April 1942 became the Gau representative of the Plenipotentiary for Labor Allocation, Fritz Sauckel. On 16 November 1942, when the jurisdiction for the Reich Defense Commissioners was changed from the Wehrkreis to the Gau level, he was appointed Commissioner for his Gau. In this capacity, he had responsibility for civil defense and evacuation measures, as well as control over the war economy, including rationing and suppression of black market activities. Shortly after the massive incendiary air raid on Kassel of 22 October 1943, which destroyed the entire city center, Weinrich was charged with failing in Kassel's war preparations and abandoning the city to its fate during the bombing, returning only to check on the condition of his own property.

Reichsminister of Propaganda, Joseph Goebbels, wrote a scathing report to Hitler and commented in his diary:
”Weinrich has in no way proven equal to the demands made on him by the recent air raid. The entire center of the city and most of the outlying sections have been destroyed. A gruesome picture strikes the eye … Much may have been prevented or at least mitigated if suitable preparations had been taken by the Gau leadership … Weinrich played a very sorry role … I shall certainly report to the Führer the pitiful role he played as Gauleiter and urge that he be quickly replaced.”

Weinrich was placed on extended leave from his posts on 6 November 1943 and was retired to his farming estate in Trendelburg for the remainder of the war. His successor was Karl Gerland, then the Deputy Gauleiter in Reichsgau Lower Danube. Gerland was made the permanent Gauleiter on 13 December 1944.

Postwar life
After the war ended, Weinrich was interned in the Eselheide internment camp from 1945 to 1950. He underwent denazification proceedings and was adjudged to be in Category I, Major Offenders. On 6 July 1949, he was sentenced to ten years imprisonment in a labor camp by the Kassel Chamber of Justice. In November 1950 he was released, in consideration of time served. He returned to Trendelburg, then to Hausen (today, Obertshausen) and finally back to Kassel at the beginning of the 1960s. In 1960, the court in Kassel denied his request for compensation for loss of property during the wartime air raid. He died on 22 July 1973.

References

Sources

Lengemann, Jochen: MdL Hessen. 1808–1996. Biographischer Index (= Politische und parlamentarische Geschichte des Landes Hessen. Bd. 14 = Veröffentlichungen der Historischen Kommission für Hessen. Bd. 48, 7). Elwert, Marburg 1996, .

Weinrich, Karl in der Rheinland-Pfälzische Personendatenbank Rheinland-Pfälzische Bibliographie

External links

"Goebbels: „Der gute Weinrich ist keine Leuchte“ – vor 80 Jahren wurde Karl Weinrich  Gauleiter der NSDAP von Kurhessen", by Thomas Schattner

1887 births
1973 deaths
Gauleiters
German Army personnel of World War I
Members of the Reichstag of Nazi Germany
National Socialist Motor Corps members
Nazis convicted of crimes
Nazi Party officials
Nazi Party politicians
People from Mansfeld-Südharz
People from the Province of Saxony